Belize Medical Associates is a private hospital in Belize City, Belize. It was developed in 1988, as a single clinic. A decade after they opened, in 1998, they changed from a private clinic into a small hospital featuring two surgical theaters and 18 beds. Belize's first female architect, Esther Ayuso worked on the hospital expansion. By 2010, a subsequent expansion had created space for 25 beds.

Facilities
The hospital is located at 5791 St. Thomas Street, Kings Park in Belize City.

It currently provides:
24-hour emergency service
Modern 25-bed Hospital
Well Stocked Pharmacy
Advanced Laboratory
Modern radiology services
Fully equipped operating theater
Multi-specialist & Primary Care Clinics
Cardiac Care Unit
Neurological Unit

Its stated mission is
"To provide the Highest Quality Health Care Service in Belize that is Complete, Affordable and done in an Ethical Manner."

References

Hospital buildings completed in 1988
Hospitals in Belize
Buildings and structures in Belize City